Polish Aviation Group is Poland's largest aviation company. It was founded in 2018 with an aim to merge Polish companies including LOT Polish Airlines, LOT Aircraft Maintenance Services, LS Airport Services and LS Technics. The group's headquarters are in Warsaw.

History 
PGL (Polska Grupa Lotnicza) was formed in January 2018 and consists of LOT Polish Airlines, LOT Aircraft Maintenance Services and LS Airport Services and LS Technics which were merged into the group in early October 2018. Its CEO is Rafał Milczarski. It was started with a capital of PLN 1.2 billion (EUR 290 million) as a joint stock company in January 2018. The new state-owned Polish Aviation Group (PGL), endowed with capital of PLN 2.5 billion, brings together the country’s largest aviation service providers.

On 24 January 2020 PGL announced that it would acquire Condor Flugdienst, and that the transaction was expected to be completed in April 2020 after consideration from anti-trust regulators. On 2 April 2020 it was announced that the sale had fallen through.

Corporate Affairs

Divisions and Subsidiaries 
Their main subsidiaries are:

  LOT Polish Airlines
 
  Nordica  49% Stake 
 
  LOT Aircraft Maintenance Services
 
  LS Airport Services
 
  LS Technics
 
  PGL Leasing

Financial Results

Operations 
In 2019, LOT Polish Airlines served 10 million passengers which was their highest amount yet.

References 

Airlines of Poland
Airlines established in 2018
Polish companies established in 2018
Manufacturing companies established in 2018
Manufacturing companies of Poland
Polish brands